Kym Elizabeth Whitley is an American comedian and actress. She is best known for her roles on television sitcoms, such as My Brother and Me, Sparks, Animal Practice, The Boondocks, Young & Hungry, The Parkers,               
The Cleveland Show, and Black Dynamite. Whitley was nominated for a 2004 BET Comedy Award for Outstanding Supporting Actress in a Box Office Movie for her role as Ormandy in the 2003 comedy film Deliver Us From Eva.

Early life and education 
Whitley was born in Shaker Heights, Ohio to Kaysonia and William Whitley. Her father was a founding partner of the black architectural firm of Whitley and Whitley. Whitley and Whitley was involved with work on Tower City Center, the Cleveland State University Convocation Center, Lincoln Junior High School, the Lee-Harvard Branch of Cleveland Public Library, the Central Area Multi-Service Center, and the Cleveland Clinic Guesthouse development. They were also involved in a joint venture to design and build Jacobs Field (now Progressive Field), home to the Cleveland Indians. She attended Shaker Heights High School (graduating in 1979) and Fisk University in Nashville, Tennessee. She was initiated into the Alpha Beta chapter of the Delta Sigma Theta sorority.

Career
In 1989, Whitley got her big break starring in Shelly Garrett's popular play Beauty Shop, which started in Los Angeles then later traveled across the United States. Whitley's major acting roles include the short-lived sitcoms My Brother and Me and Sparks. She has made guest appearances on several television sitcoms, including The Parent 'Hood, Married... with Children, Moesha, That's So Raven, The Parkers, My Wife and Kids and Curb Your Enthusiasm. She also hosted the short-lived BET show Oh Drama (2000). Whitley had a small role in Next Friday as Craig's aunt Suga. She was part of a group called "The Adults", which featured actors who were adult cast members in the earlier seasons of All That. In the early spring of 2010, Whitley was a co-host with R&B musician Brian McKnight on the short-lived talk show The Brian McKnight Show. From 2012 to 2013, Whitley had a recurring role on the BET comedy Let's Stay Together as Charmaine Wax.

On April 20, 2013, her reality docu-series titled Raising Whitley premiered on the Oprah Winfrey Network, with a total of 1.2 million viewers, making it the fifth most-widely viewed premiere in the history of the network. OWN ordered a second season, which premiered on January 4, 2014. Whitley then joined the cast of the television sitcom Young & Hungry which premiered on ABC Family (now Freeform) in 2014, where she played Josh's housekeeper Yolanda. The show ran for five seasons, ending in 2018. In 2017, she guest starred in the web series The Bay where she played Big Candi. She received a Daytime Emmy Award nomination for Outstanding Supporting or Guest Actress in a Digital Daytime Drama Series. In 2018, she guest starred in the "Thanksgiving" episode of Master of None as Denise's aunt Joyce, and sister to Angela Bassett's character. The episode won an Emmy for Best Writing for Master of None's actors Aziz Ansari and Lena Waithe. Whitley was later a recurring guest host on the E! shows Daily Pop and Nightly Pop. In 2023, she played the role of Aunt Nadine in the film You People.

Causes
In 2013, Whitley and her friend Rodney Van Johnson launched a line of t-shirts titled "Don't Feed Me." The shirts alert caregivers about children who have specific food allergies.

Personal life 
Whitley has two older brothers, Kyle and Scott. In January 2011, she adopted her son, Joshua.

Filmography

Film

Television

Documentary

Awards and nominations

References

External links

Living people
Actors from Shaker Heights, Ohio
Actresses from Tennessee
Fisk University alumni
20th-century American actresses
21st-century American actresses
African-American female comedians
American women comedians
American voice actresses
American television actresses
African-American actresses
American film actresses
Actresses from Ohio
Comedians from Ohio
20th-century American comedians
21st-century American comedians
20th-century African-American women
20th-century African-American people
21st-century African-American women
21st-century African-American people
Year of birth missing (living people)